WBGB may refer to:

 Bintulu Airport (ICAO code WBGB)
 WBGB (FM), a radio station (103.3 FM) licensed to serve Boston, Massachusetts, United States
 WPDQ (FM), a radio station (91.3 FM) licensed to serve Scottsville, Kentucky, United States, which held the call sign WBGB from 2008 to 2018
 WXXJ (FM), a radio station (106.5 FM) licensed to serve Ponte Vedra Beach, Florida, United States, which held the call sign WBGB from 1998 to 2006